The Road Transport Department Malaysia, (Malay: Jabatan Pengangkutan Jalan Malaysia, abbreviated JPJ), is a government department under the Malaysian Ministry of Transport. This department is responsible for issuing Malaysian number plates. Its head office is in Level 1-5, Block D4, Complex D, in the Federal Government Administrative Centre in Putrajaya.

The department is charged with the responsibility of undertaking registration and licensing of drivers and all motor vehicles and trailers in Malaysia. According to the Road Transport Act, the enforcement and regulatory duties are under the roles and responsibilities of JPJ. The current director general of the department is Dato' Sri Shaharuddin bin Khalid.

KEJARA system
Demerit Points System or Sistem Merit Kesalahan Jalan Raya (KEJARA) is a road offenders demerit point system.

Main purpose
 To reduce road accidents
 To take action against traffic offenders

See also

 Driving licence in Malaysia
 Vehicle registration plates of Malaysia
 Puspakom
 Road signs in Malaysia
 Transport in Malaysia

References

 Adopted from Kurikulum Pendidikan Pemanduan (KPP), Panduan Pembelajaran textbook by Malaysian Road Transport Department (JPJ)

External links
 
 JPJ unofficial website
 

Road Transport
Road transport in Malaysia
Ministry of Transport (Malaysia)